Doro is the second solo album of the German female hard rock singer Doro Pesch. The album was released on 25 September 1990.

Overview
Doro's second album is more a solo effort than a band production. In fact, the German singer chose for herself a new musical direction, consciously separating the music creative process from normal band dynamics, the contrary of what she had always done in the past with Warlock. The album production was put in the hands of Kiss bassist Gene Simmons, Doro's childhood idol. Simmons provided five songs, including the covers of The Electric Prunes' 60s psychedelic hit "I Had Too Much to Dream" and of Black 'n Blue's "Rock On", and musicians coming from the Kiss' entourage to complete the recording. The song "Only You" is a Kiss cover from the album Music from "The Elder" (1981). He gave his protégé Tommy Thayer from the band Black 'n Blue (another band Simmons produced) a chance to shine as co-producer of the album, along with Pat Regan. "I'll Be Holding On" is a cover of a Gregg Allman song from the 1989 film Black Rain.

The resulting sound is much smoother and polished than any Warlock album, in the vein of many American glam metal recordings of the time, and the lyrics give up completely the gothic atmosphere present in the offerings of Doro Pesch's previous band. 
The many photos on the cover and inner sleeve were taken by famous Playboy and fashion photographer Phillip Dixon. Despite the commercial appeal of the music and the high economic effort in producing it, the album did not have the critical and sales success that was expected and remained the last studio album by Doro published in the United States for ten years.

Track listing

Personnel
Musicians
 Doro Pesch – vocals
 Tommy Thayer – lead, rhythm and acoustic guitars, producer
 Lanny Cordola – lead guitar
 Pat Regan – keyboards, producer, engineer, mixing
 Karen Childs, Paul Morris – keyboards
 E. J. Curse, Todd Jensen, Chuck Wright – bass
 Tommy Amato, Chris Frazier, Kevin Valentine – drums

Production
 Gene Simmons – executive producer
 Greg Calbi – mastering

References

External links
 American site
 "Unholy Love" video clip
 "Rare Diamond" video clip

1990 albums
Albums produced by Gene Simmons
Doro (musician) albums
Vertigo Records albums